Artificial worlds or artificial planets have been created by writers in the fields of science speculation, speculative fiction and fiction.

Such megastructures could have a variety of advantages over natural planets, such as efficient use of solar energy and immense living space, but their construction and/or maintenance would require technologies so much more advanced than those of 21st-century Earth that it is currently unknown if they are even achievable.

It was often stated, that it is more possible to build a 2-gigaton Dyson sphere than a laser rifle, but still ringworlds etc. are treated in sci-fi as symbol of immense power, often relic of Precursor civilization or symbol of all-powerful future empire.

Examples of artificial worlds include:
Culture Orbitals
Dyson spheres
Globus Cassus
Ringworld

The main plot of the Neill Blomkamp science fiction action movie Elysium focuses on a dystopian future where the poor live on a post apocalyptic Earth in ruins, working in nightmarish city conditions and patrolled by robotic officers while the rich live on a Stanford torus design man made planet known as Elysium that hovers just above Earth that has many technological pleasures and machines that can fix almost any health ailment known to man.

In Douglas Adams' Hitchhiker's Guide To The Galaxy, an advanced race referred to as the Magratheans designed and built planets for the wealthy inhabitants of the galaxy, and the book went on to theorize that the Magratheans also designed and built Earth.

In Star Wars Legends continuity, a race called the Celestials (not to be confused with the Celestials of Marvel Comics) using Centerpoint Station, built the Corellian System.

See also
 The High Frontier: Human Colonies in Space

Megastructures
Science fiction themes